Kieslingswalde is a placename of  German origin that refers to:
Idzików, Poland
Sławnikowice, Lower Silesian Voivodeship, Poland
Łopatki, Wąbrzeźno County, Poland